The Adelaide Regiment of Volunteer Rifles was a infantry regiment of the Colony of South Australia. It was formed in 1860, as the Adelaide Regiment, following the amalgamation of a number of rifle companies. It continued to exist periodically throughout the 19th century until the Federation of Australia.

History

Prehistory 
The initial legislation that enable the formation of the Regiment, was the Act No. 2 of 1854, entitled "An Act to organize and establish a Volunteer Military Force in South Australia".

In 1859, a number of volunteer rifle companies were raised in various locations across the South Australian colony, and were formed in response to the same reasons as the Volunteer Force in Great Britain.

Formation 
In May 1860, the Adelaide Regiment was raised, and consisted of 20 individual rifle companies that were previously raised before their amalgamation into the regiment.  In February 1865 the Hindmarsh Rifle company was added to the Regiment.

In 1861, the Regiment was reorganised, with the amount of companies being reduced to 13.

in 1865, the regiment was re-organised under Act No. 18 of 1865, entitled the "Volunteer Act 1865-66", wherein companies, although still organised by location, were numbered.

Lineage 
The original volunteer companies that were amalgamated include:The companies that were originally apart of the regiment, but were disbanded, include:

Following the Australian Federation, the regiment continued as the 1st Regiment Adelaide Rifles until 1903 when it spawned the following units:

 10th (Adelaide Rifles) Australian Infantry Regiment, 1903–1911
 78th (Adelaide Rifles) Battalion, 1911–1921
 10th (Adelaide Rifles) Battalion, periodically from 1921–1987
 10th/27th Battalion, Royal South Australian Regiment, 1987–present

Commanders 
The regiment was only commanded by two officers before it was disbanded

 Lieutenant-Colonel B. T. Finniss, May 1860 – August 1863
 Lieutenant-Colonel George Mayo, August 1863

References

Bibliography 

 

Military units and formations of Australia
Military units and formations established in 1860
1860 establishments in Australia